WEGM (95.1 FM) is a radio station broadcasting a rhythmic contemporary hit radio format. Licensed to San Germán, Puerto Rico, the station serves the western Puerto Rico area. The station is currently owned by Spanish Broadcasting System Holding Company, Inc.

History
The station went on the air as WRPC on February 1, 1969, that stands for "Radio Porta Coeli". It is remembered for its "Radio Heavy", "Radio Color" and "Zeta 95" monikers. On June 4, 1996, the station changed its call sign to WCTA-FM, and on March 31, 2001 to the current WEGM.

References

External links

Spanish Broadcasting System radio stations
Radio stations established in 1969
1969 establishments in Puerto Rico
San Germán, Puerto Rico
Rhythmic contemporary radio stations
EGM